The International Poetry Festival of Rosario (in Spanish, Festival Internacional de Poesía de Rosario) is a cultural event organized in Rosario, Argentina. It gathers public and poets from Argentina and other countries, especially Latin American ones, and includes poetry readings, workshops, lectures, and stage plays.

The Festival is held annually since 1993. It usually takes place in September at the facilities of the Bernardino Rivadavia Culture Center, at Plaza Montenegro, in downtown Rosario. It is organized jointly by the Santa Fe Province Culture Subsecretariat and the Education and Culture Secretariat of the Municipality of Rosario, and is supported by the national Culture Secretariat.

Poets who attended the festival

External links
http://www.fipr.com.ar Festival Internacional de Poesía at the Municipality of Rosario. 
 2003 Festival. Culture of Santa Fe Province. 
 

Recurring events established in 1993
September events
Poetry festivals in Argentina
Literary festivals in Argentina
Culture in Rosario, Santa Fe
Arts festivals in Argentina
Spring (season) events in Argentina